AutoCanada Inc. is a North American multi-location automobile dealership group currently operating 82 franchised dealerships, consisting of 28 brands in eight provinces in Canada as well as a group in Illinois, USA. AutoCanada currently sells Chrysler, Dodge, Jeep, Ram, FIAT, Alfa Romeo, Chevrolet, GMC, Buick, Cadillac, Ford, Infiniti, Nissan, Hyundai, Subaru, Audi, Volkswagen, Kia, Mazda, Mercedes-Benz, BMW, MINI, Volvo, Toyota, Lincoln, Acura, Honda and Porsche branded vehicles. In addition, AutoCanada's Canadian Operations segment currently operates 3 used vehicle dealerships and 1 used vehicle auction business supporting the Used Digital Retail Division, 11 RightRide division locations, and 10 stand-alone collision centres within our group of 25 collision centres. In 2022, our dealerships sold approximately 100,000 vehicles and processed over 900,000 service and collision repair orders in our 1,367 service bays generating revenue in excess of $6 billion.

Management team
As of 2022, AutoCanada is managed by the following people:
Paul Antony (Executive Chairman) 
Jeff Thorpe (President) 
Azim Lalani (Chief Financial Officer)
Peter Hong (Chief Strategy Officer & General Counsel)

References

External links 

Companies listed on the Toronto Stock Exchange
Retail companies established in 2006
Auto dealerships of Canada
Companies based in Edmonton